Andøya Space, also named Andøya Space Center and formerly Andøya Rocket Range, is a rocket launch site, rocket range, and spaceport on Andøya island (the northernmost in the Vesterålen archipelago) in Andøy Municipality in Nordland county, Norway. Since 1962, over 1,200 sounding and sub-orbital rockets of various configurations have been launched from the site.

Andøya Space is a civilian aksjeselskap (limited liability company) with its ownership split between two groups: 90% by the Royal Norwegian Ministry of Trade and Industry, and 10% by Kongsberg Defence Systems company. It operates on a commercial basis but is operated by the Norwegian Space Agency, a government agency within the Ministry of Trade and Industry.  Andøya Space also remotely supports the SvalRak launch facility in Svalbard to the north. The facility has provided operations for both ESA and NASA missions and scientific research.

History

Ferdinand 1 
On August 18, 1962, the rocket that was to take Norway into the space age, Ferdinand 1, launched from Andøya Rocket Range. This happened only five years after the Soviet Union launched the first man-made satellite, Sputnik 1.

The Norwegian scientists named the rocket "Ferdinand" after the story of the peaceful bull that did not like to fight but would rather sit in the meadow smelling the flowers. The name was appropriate since the area of the Rocket Range was called Oksebåsen, “The Ox Pasture”. This was during the Cold War, so the name should also indicate that Andøya Rocket Range only had peaceful intentions with its research.

Ferdinand-1 was a NIKE-Cajun two-stage rocket that carried two instruments in its payload. The purpose of the launch was to do measurements in the ionosphere, where charged particles from the sun ionize the atoms. The process is most intense in the polar ionosphere, and is important not only for the Northern Lights, but also for long-range radio communication, because the free electrons reflect the radio waves. The goal was to explore the possibility of improving long-range radio communication.

The rocket was 7.7 m long, had a total weight of 698 kg and a maximum speed of 6760 km/h. It reached a height of 102 km into the atmosphere. Launching and collecting data after the first rocket was considered a success. Ferdinand 1 became the first of many successful rocket launches from Andøya.

Svalbard Rocket Range 
In 1997, a second launch site—Svalbard Rocket Range—was established at Ny-Ålesund, Svalbard, enabling scientists to launch sounding rockets straight in the polar cusp, where the earth's magnetic field lines converge.

A ground-based, lidar observatory, ALOMAR (Arctic Lidar Observatory for Middle Atmosphere Research) opened in 1994, and is considered unique in atmospheric research in the Arctic. The range is also host of northern Europe's largest VHF-radar.

In 1995, a Black Brant sounding rocket launched from Andøya caused a high alert in Russia, known as the Norwegian Rocket Incident. The Russians thought it might be a nuclear missile launched from an American submarine. President Boris Yeltsin was alerted for a possible counter strike, when the Russians understood that it was not heading towards Russia. 
The Russians were informed in advance about the launch by the rocket range personnel, but this information was lost in the Russian military organisation.

The space center changed its name from Andøya Rocket Range on 6 June 2014 to reflect an increased focus on also other activities than sounding rockets, though rocketry is still its main focus. Other activities are UAVs, lidar and radar measurements for atmospheric research and also a test center for missiles through its subsidiary Andøya Test Center.

Orbital launch plans
Andøya has been proposed as a spaceport for launching orbital Nanosatellite launch vehicles (NLVs).

North Star 
In January 2013, the Nammo company and the Andøya Space Center announced that they would be "developing a rocket system called North Star that will use a standardized hybrid motor, clustered in different numbers and arrangements, to build two types of sounding rockets and an orbital launcher" that would be able to deliver a   nanosat into polar orbit.

Andøya Spaceport   
Andøya Spaceport was established as a project in 2018, with the aim of establishing the first European launch base for small satellites. It is mainly satellites for Earth observation and communications that are planned to be launched from Andøya, in polar- or sun-synchronous orbit. In polar orbit, the satellite passes above or near the Earth's poles at each orbit. This is favorable for Norway as they then provide good satellite coverage of Norwegian areas, good communication and sea monitoring in the north. Sun-synchronous orbit means that the satellite passes a given latitude to two fixed local times, one for northbound and one for southbound passage. The satellite's orbital plane rotates eastwards approx. 1 degree per day, and so it maintains the angle with respect to the sunlight and gets most light for its solar cells. In this way, satellites for Earth observation receive data with an equal amount of sunlight and can thus use data to analyze changes that occur on the surface throughout the year. Norway funded the site with NOK 365.6 million, expecting a commercial return of the investment.

Pads 
Andøya has six launch pads during all or part of its life as a launch site:
 LC5 
 LC9 
 LC10 
 Athena 
 Haugnes 
 U3

References

External links 
 Andøya Space website
 Astronautix - Andoya

Rocket launch sites in Norway
Spaceports in Europe
Buildings and structures in Nordland
Andøy
1962 establishments in Norway
Norwegian Space Centre